Ravamehran is a village in Iran, located in Bahreman Rural District, Nuq District, Rafsanjan County, Kerman Province. It had a population of 1,074 at the 2016 census.

References 

Populated places in Rafsanjan County